WWF may refer to:

Computing and games 
WWF (file format), a campaign for unprintable PDF documents
Windows Workflow Foundation, a software component of the .NET Framework
Words with Friends, a mobile computer game franchise

Non-profit organizations 
World Wide Fund for Nature or World Wildlife Fund, a conservation group
World Water Forum, an international forum for water issues
Working Women's Forum, a training, trade and credit union in India
Waterside Workers' Federation of Australia, a defunct Australian trade union

Other uses
Welded wire fabric or welded wire mesh, a reinforcing material used in poured concrete slabs
Wiscasset, Waterville and Farmington Railway, a former 2-foot-gauge railroad in Maine, United States
WWE (formerly WWF), an American wrestling promotion